William Plant (2 December 1944 – 26 March 2018) was a Jamaican sailor. He competed in the Flying Dutchman event at the 1968 Summer Olympics.

References

External links
 

1944 births
2018 deaths
Jamaican male sailors (sport)
Olympic sailors of Jamaica
Sailors at the 1968 Summer Olympics – Flying Dutchman
Sportspeople from Kingston, Jamaica